Drummer Boy may refer to:
"The Little Drummer Boy", a popular Christmas song
"Drummer Boy" (Justin Bieber song), a rendition of "The Little Drummer Boy" with added rap verses by Justin Bieber and Busta Rhymes from the album Under the Mistletoe
The Little Drummer Boy (TV special), a stop-motion animated television special released in 1968
Drummer boy (military), children recruited for use as military drummers on the battlefield
Drumma Boy, American record producer and hip hop artist
"Drummer Boy" (Alesha Dixon song), a song by English singer-songwriter Alesha Dixon released in 2010
"Drummer Boy" (Debi Nova song), a single by Costa Rican singer-songwriter Debi Nova released in 2010 
Drummer Boy (EP), a 1995 EP by Christian folk group Jars of Clay